This list of castles in Champagne-Ardenne is a list of medieval castles or château forts in the region in northern France.

Links in italics are links to articles in the French Wikipedia.

Ardennes

Aube

Haute-Marne

Marne

See also
 List of castles in France
 List of châteaux in France

References

 Champagne-Ardenne